The Frame (El marco in Spanish) is a 1938 self-portrait by Frida Kahlo. The painting is notable as the first work by a 20th-century Mexican artist to be purchased by a major international museum, when it was acquired by The Louvre in 1939. The painting is now shown at the Musée National d'Art Moderne in the Centre Pompidou in Paris.

It was the only sale Kahlo made in her Paris exhibition.

References

Paintings by Frida Kahlo
1938 paintings
Birds in art
Self-portraits
Paintings in the collection of the Musée National d'Art Moderne